Eusebiu Iancu Diaconu (born March 16, 1981 in Bacău) is an amateur Romanian Greco-Roman wrestler, who played for the men's lightweight category. He is a two-time Olympian, a three-time medalist at the European Championships, and a three-time bronze medalist (2003, 2005, and 2007) for his division at the World Championships. He is also a member of CCS Bacau Wrestling, and is coached and trained by Gheorghe Mocanu.

Diaconu made his official debut for the 2004 Summer Olympics in Athens, where he reached the knock-out stage of the men's 60 kg, by winning the preliminary pool round against U.S. wrestler Jim Gruenwald and Portugal's Hugo Passos. He lost the quarterfinal match to South Korea's Jung Ji-Hyun, with a final score of 0–6.

At the 2008 Summer Olympics in Beijing, Diaconu competed for the second time in the men's 60 kg class. He first defeated Egypt's Ashraf El-Gharably by a superiority decision in the qualifying round, before losing out the preliminary round of sixteen to Azerbaijan's Vitaliy Rahimov, with a classification score of 1–3. Because his opponent advanced further into the final match, Diaconu offered another shot for the bronze medal by entering the repechage bouts. He was defeated by China's Sheng Jiang in the first round, with a score of 5–8.

References

External links
NBC Olympics Profile
 

Romanian male sport wrestlers
1981 births
Living people
Olympic wrestlers of Romania
Wrestlers at the 2004 Summer Olympics
Wrestlers at the 2008 Summer Olympics
Sportspeople from Bacău
World Wrestling Championships medalists